Bozkurt of Dulkadir, also known as Alaüddevle, (died June 13, 1515) was a bey of Beylik of Dulkadir, a Turkish beylik (principality) in Anatolia

Background
Dulkadir was a semi independent beylik under the sovereignty of the Mamluk Egypt. The beylik was located around Kahramanmaraş and Elbistan, which made the beylik a buffer territory of the Mamluks against the Ottoman Empire. After the former bey Şahsuvar was executed in Cairo by the Mamluks, Shah Budak was appointed as the bey. But his brother Bozkurt was waiting for his chance.

Early years as a bey
Bozkurt took control of the beylik in 1480 by the support of Ottoman Sultan Mehmed II. Being cautious not to antagonise the Mamluks, he followed a balanced policy between the two great powers. One of his daughters, Ayşe Hatun, married to the Ottoman prince Bayazid (Bayazid II, the future sultan of the Ottomans).

Bozkurt captured the city Diyarbakır from the Ak Koyunlu Turkmen dynasty. But he was not successful against Ismail I of the Safavids in Iran. When Ismail stormed his capital Elbistan, he had to move the capital to Maraş, today Kahramanmaraş.

War during the reign of Bayazıt II
In 1481, Bayazıt II rose to the throne of the Ottoman Empire. During the civil war between Bayazıt II and his brother Cem, Mamluks supported Cem and the uneasy peace between the two powers ended. Ottomans tried to control Çukurova,  Cilicia of the antiquity, a region to the southwest of Dulkadir territory and under the control of Ramadanids, another buffer principality. But they were  defeated by the Mamluks. Influenced by the Mamluk victory, Bozkurt gave up his balanced policy and began hostilities against the Ottomans. In 1486, he defeated an Ottoman force under the commandship of Skender Pasha. However, Mamluks were not able to defeat Ottomans to the north of the Taurus Mountains and following a stalemate, the war ended in 1491.

War during the reign of Selim I
In 1512, Selim I, nicknamed "the Inflexible" or "the Grim", became the Ottoman Sultan. In 1514, during his campaign to Iran, Bozkurt's reluctance to allow safe pass for the Ottoman forces caused a problem. In 1515, before starting a war against the Mamluks, he decided to end the Dulkadir Beylik as well. He sent Hadim Sinan Pasha, his future grand vizier, to Dulkadir territory. In a battle called the Battle of Turnadağ, Sinan Pasha defeated Dulkadir army. Bozkurt as well as his sons were killed.

Trivia
The origin of Selim's mother Ayşe Hatun is debatable. She might be Bozkurt's daughter. If that were the case, than Bozkurt was Selim's maternal grandfather.

Citation

Sources
 
 
 

15th-century births
1515 deaths
Year of birth unknown
Turkic rulers
Dulkadirids
15th-century monarchs in Asia
16th-century monarchs in Asia